Ocnaea auripilosa is a species of small-headed flies in the family Acroceridae.

References

Acroceridae
Insects described in 1923
Taxa named by Charles Willison Johnson
Diptera of North America